The 2023 USL League One season will be the fifth season of USL League One.

Twelve teams will participate in the 2023 season. Each team will play ten teams three times and the one remaining team twice for a total of 32 games. Top six teams will qualify for the playoffs. Lexington SC enters as an expansion team and One Knoxville SC joins from USL League Two. FC Tucson left to rejoin USL League Two.

Tormenta FC are the defending champions, having defeated Chattanooga Red Wolves in the 2022 final.

Teams

Managerial changes

League table

Results table

Regular season statistical leaders

Top scorers

Hat tricks

Top assists

Clean sheets

See also
 USL League One

References

External links
 USL League One official website

 
2023
2023 in American soccer leagues